Lambanóg is a traditional Filipino distilled coconut palm liquor. It is derived from tubâ made from coconut sap that has been aged for at least 48 hours. It originates from Luzon and the Visayas Islands (where it is known as dalisay de coco). During the Spanish colonial period, it was also known as vino de coco in Spanish. It is also commonly described as "coconut vodka" due to its clear to milky white color and high alcohol content. It is particularly potent, having a typical alcohol content of 80 to 90 proof (40 to 45% abv) after a single distillation; this may go as high as 166 proof (83% abv) after the second distillation. Its smoothness has been compared to that of Japanese sake and European schnapps.

A similar distilled drink made from nipa palm sap is known as laksoy.

History

Tubâ, a kind of palm wine, existed in the Philippines before colonisation. They were widely consumed for recreation and played an important role in various religious rituals. Heavy consumption of alcohol in the Philippine islands was described in several Spanish accounts. Social drinking (tagayan or inuman in Tagalog and Visayan languages) was and continues to be an important aspect of Filipino social interactions.

Tubâ could be further distilled in distinctive indigenous stills, resulting to the lambanóg, a palm liquor derived from tubâ. There were hundreds of local distilleries for lambanóg production, largely improvised. They varied from portable stills with around  capacity, to large stills that can process . They usually consisted of two large pans (kawa or karaha), a hollowed out log, and a bamboo tube. One pan was filled with the tubâ and set on the fire. The hollowed out log was placed in between, acting as the walls of the still. The second pan was then placed on top of the wooden cylinder and constantly filled with cold water to induce condensation. A bamboo tube was attached to the wooden cylinder to collect the distillate to containers. Larger stills were barrel-like and made from planks reinforced with rattan hoops. The joints of the still were sealed with clay or rags. The entire upper part of the apparatus was usually connected to a lever that allowed them to be swung aside to refill or clean the lower pan.

During the Spanish colonial period of the Philippines, lambanog was inaccurately called vino de coco ("coconut wine"). From around 1569, it was introduced via the Manila galleons to  Nueva Galicia (present-day Colima, Jalisco, and Nayarit), Mexico  by Filipino immigrants who established coconut planations. It quickly became highly popular in the region. It competed with the sales of imported spirits from Spain, leading Spanish colonial authorities and the Royal Audience in Spain to ban the production of vino de coco and issue an order for the destruction of coconut plantations. By the mid-1700s, vino de coco production in Mexico had ceased (though non-alcoholic variants of tubâ persisted). The prohibition of vino de coco and the introduced distillation technologies from the Philippines led to the development of mezcal and tequila by the indigenous peoples of Mexico.

During the American colonial period, the Food and Drugs Board of the Philippine Islands set up regulated distilleries for lambanóg with modern equipment. Home production of lambanóg was made illegal, as unregulated production can result in the retention of toxic levels of methanol due to improper procedures. They also standardized the trade name of lambanóg to "Philippine palm brandy" (also "Philippine coco palm brandy"). This was due to the fact that they were distilled (and thus not wines); as well as concerns about the local prejudice against "native drinks" (which are generally known as vino or bino) which could affect their marketability.

Description
Lambanóg has a very high alcohol content of 40%-45% abv (80 to 90 proof), in comparison to bahalina (10%-13% abv) and tubâ (2% - 4% abv). Lambanóg is usually served pure, though it can also be traditionally flavored with raisins. Modern lambanóg has recently been marketed in several flavours such as mango, blueberry, pineapple, bubblegum and cinnamon in an effort to appeal to all age groups.

Production

Lambanóg production was traditionally centered in the Southern Tagalog region. The current main producing areas are the provinces of Quezon, Laguna, and Batangas, where coconuts are a dominant agricultural crop. Most lambanóg producers are small-scale cottage industries with only around 4 to 25 employees. Quezon is the leading producer of lambanóg, hosting the three largest lambanóg distillers of the country: Mallari Distillery, Buncayo Distillery, and Capistrano Distillery. Lambanóg (as dalisay or dalisay de coco) were also produced in the Visayas Islands in the Spanish colonial period of the Philippines.

Safety
Unregistered lambanóg production is illegal in the Philippines under regulations by the Food and Drug Administration and the Department of Agriculture. Consumers are warned to only purchase lambanóg that is properly sealed and made by companies registered with the FDA. Several deaths still occur each year from methanol poisoning after drinking lambanóg moonshine or adulterated lambanóg from retailers.

In December 2019, at least 11 people died and in excess of 300 treated after drinking home-brewed lambanog coconut wine in Laguna and Quezon, two provinces south of Manila.

See also
 Mezcal
Bahalina
 Basi
 Tapuy
 Nipa palm vinegar
 Kaong palm vinegar

References

Filipino distilled drinks
Philippine alcoholic drinks
Philippine cuisine